Hanako Honda (January 1909 – 31 January 1968) was a Japanese politician. She was one of the first group of women elected to the House of Representatives in 1946.

Biography
Honda was born in Kobe in 1909 and graduated from  Mizuki Higher Elementary School. In 1946, she contested the Osaka 2nd district in the general elections as a candidate of the Japan Women's Party, and was elected to the House of Representatives. After being elected, she joined the Japan Liberal Party. During her time in parliament, she introduced a members' bill for the enlargement of medical facilities for public school children and others. She contested Osaka's fifth district in the 1947 elections as a Liberal Party candidate, but lost her seat. She died in 1968.

References

1909 births
People from Kobe
20th-century Japanese women politicians
20th-century Japanese politicians
Members of the House of Representatives (Japan)
Liberal Party (Japan, 1945) politicians
1968 deaths